The 1996 USISL Premier League season was its second. The season began in April 1996 and ended in August 1996.

Central Coast Roadrunners won the championship, defeating the San Francisco Bay Seals 3–2.  Spokane Shadow won the regular season title, winning 14 games to 2 losses.

Changes from 1995 season

Name changes 
 Ann Arbor Elites became the Michigan Madness.
 Arizona Cotton became the Arizona Phoenix.
 Montclair Standard Falcons moved to Fontana, CA and became the Fontana Falcons.
 Oklahoma City Slickers changed their name to the Oklahoma City Heat.
 San Francisco All-Blacks United changed their name to the San Francisco Bay Seals.
 Wichita Blue Angels changed their name to the Wichita Blue.

New teams 
12 teams were added for the season.

Teams leaving
Five teams folded after the 1995 season:
 Arkansas A's
 Columbia Heat
 Inland Empire Panteras
 North Bay Breakers
 Shasta Scorchers

Standings

Central Conference

Northern Division

Southern Division

Eastern Conference

Northern Division

Southern Division

Western Conference

Northern Division

Southern Division

Playoffs

Format 
Central Coast received a bye to the PDL Semifinals as the defending champion.
The top four teams from every division except the Southwest earn playoff spots.  With Central Coast already receiving a bye, the top two teams from the Southwest Division will play each other, however if Central Coast is in the top two, then the third place team receives a playoff spot.  The Division winners would then face each other in the Conference finals.

Divisional brackets

PDL Finals brackets

Premier Six Tournament
Six teams entered the Premier Six Tournament in Cocoa, Florida the weekend of August 16–18.  Each of the five division playoff champions qualified for the tournament, along with the host Cocoa Expos.  The teams were seeded in this order, based on their regular season points:

 1. Central Coast Roadrunners
 2. San Francisco Bay Seals
 3. Cocoa Expos
 4. Omaha Flames
 5. Jackson Chargers
 6. Mid-Michigan Bucks.

The Central Coast Roadrunners played the bottom two seeds (Jackson and Mid-Michigan).  The San Francisco Seals played the #4 and #6 seeds (Omaha and Mid-Michigan).  The Cocoa Expos played  and #4 and #5 seeds (Omaha and Jackson).

Qualification to the finals
In order to determine the two teams to qualify for the finals, the league used the following point system during the Premier Six Tournament:

 Win = 3 points
 Shootout win = 2 points
 Shootout loss = 1 point
 Bonus points: Each team scoring three or more goals in regulation or overtime received one extra point.

Friday

Saturday

Final

 MVP: Bryan Taylor

Honors
 MVP: Pasi Kinturi
 Points leader: Pasi Kinturi
 Goals leader: Pasi Kinturi
 Assists leader:  Steve Freeman
 Rookie of the Year: Bryan Taylor
 Goalkeeper of the Year: Michael LaBerge
 Defender of the Year:  Dwyane Demmin
 Coach of the Year:  Nuno Piteira
 Organization of the Year:  Central Coast Roadrunners
 All League
 Goalkeeper: Michael LaBerge
 Defenders: Steve Freeman, Dwyane Demmin, Zane Higgins, Jeremy Oetman
 Midfielders: Jude Beller, Toni Siikala
 Forwards: Pasi Kinturi, Chris McDonald, Dennis Brose, Bryan Taylor

References

External links
 United Soccer Leagues (RSSSF)

USL League Two seasons
4